Hushang Harirchiyan is an Iranian Comedian and Actor born on August 11, 1932 in Isfahan, Iran.

Biography
Harirchiyan started his career with theater in Isfahan and in 1948, he starred for the first time in a television film. Since then, he has acted in many films and series to this day. He contracted the corona virus in 2020 and recovered after a while. After that, he said, "I will not play anymore so that I do not get the Corona virus again." He has collaborated with many artists such as Ali Hatami, Soroush Sehhat, Mohammad Reza Golzar, Danial Hajibarat, Behnam Tashakkor and Elnaz Shakerdoost.

Filmography Excerpt
 Khatoon directed by Morteza Atashzamzam
 Pejman (TV series) directed by Soroush Sehhat
 Doctors' Building (TV series) directed by Soroush Sehhat
 Shadow of the Sultan (TV series) directed by Morteza Atashzamzam
 Hasht Behesht (TV series) directed by Saeed Alemzadeh
 2 Sisters directed by Mohammad Banki
 The Chef (TV series) directed by Mohammad-Reza Honarmand
 A Little Kiss directed by Bahman Farmanara
 The Wind Carpet directed by Kamal Tabrizi
 The Gun Loaded directed by Amrollah Ahmadjoo
 Jafar Khan az farang bargashteh directed by Ali Hatami''

External links

References

1932 births
Living people
Iranian comedians
Iranian male actors
People from Isfahan
Iranian radio actors
Iranian male film actors
Iranian male stage actors
Iranian radio and television presenters